The women's 4×100 metre freestyle relay event at the 1964 Olympic Games took place October 14 — October 15. The relay featured teams of four swimmers each swimming two lengths of the 50 m pool freestyle.

Medalists

Results

Heats

Heat 1

Heat 2

Final

References

Swimming at the 1964 Summer Olympics
4 × 100 metre freestyle relay
1964 in women's swimming
Women's events at the 1964 Summer Olympics